The Strater Hotel, in Durango, Colorado, was built in 1887.

It is listed on the National Register of Historic Places as a contributing building in Durango's Main Avenue Historic District.

It has been a charter member of the National Registry of the Historic Hotels of America since 1989.

References

Hotels in Colorado
National Register of Historic Places in La Plata County, Colorado
Durango, Colorado
Historic Hotels of America